Intersex, in humans and other animals, describes variations in sex characteristics including chromosomes, gonads, sex hormones, or genitals that, according to the UN Office of the High Commissioner for Human Rights, "do not fit typical binary notions of male or female bodies". Intersex is a part of nature and that is reflected in some representations of intersex in film and other media.

Documentary films about intersex

Hermaphrodites Speak! 
Hermaphrodites Speak! (1997) is a 30-minute documentary film from the United States in which several intersex people at the first retreat of the Intersex Society of North America discuss their lives and the medical treatment and parenting they received.

XXXY 
In 2000, Porter Gale, Masters in Documentary Film and Video from Stanford University, and Laleh Soomekh, produced XXXY, a documentary revealing intersex individuals'  and medical professional's opinions on the surgical procedures done on them, while providing a medical professional's opinion as well. The film clearly shows the dissatisfaction and the painful repercussions for the children who went through sex reassignment surgeries.

One in Two Thousands 
One in Two Thousand (2006) produced by Ajae Clearway features intersex individuals and their experiences with surgeries, and advocates for informed consent.

Orchids, My Intersex Adventure 
Australian documentary filmmaker Phoebe Hart directed the 2010 autobiographical documentary Orchids, My Intersex Adventure of her personal experience as an intersex person. It explores the various social scenarios faced by many intersex individuals.

Intersexion 
Grant Lahood's 2012 documentary Intersexion follows  Mani Bruce Mitchell of Intersex Trust Aotearoa New Zealand (ITANZ) as they visit intersex people in America, Ireland, Germany, South Africa and Australia. The film was directed by Grant Lahood.

The General Was Female? 
The General Was Female?, a 2019 film about American Revolutionary War General Casimir Pulaski which asserts that he was intersex.

She's Not a Boy 
Robert Tokanel and Yuhong Pang directed this 2019 documentary film about the life of Tatenda Ngwaru, an intersex woman who immigrated from Zimbabwe to the United States. It chronicles the joys and challenges she faces in asylum status, relationship with family, medical care, identity, and the LGBTQIA community.

Stories of Intersex and Faith 
The result of scholarship and interviews about the theology, biology, and personal lives of intersex people, this documentary provides a lens into the diversity of intersex people's experiences and how intersex identity intersects with different contexts.

Fiction films about intersex

Ponyboi 
Ponyboi is a USC Graduate thesis film written and directed by River Gallo. It follows a young intersex runaway in New Jersey, looking for love in all the wrong places.

After running away from home, Ponyboi (a disarming and troubled high school drop out) now works at Bubble-Land Laundromat—a grungy 24-hour establishment on the wrong side of town. To make ends meet he hustles as a sex-worker within the laundromat. He works with Vinny (his manager, pimp, and Eminem-wannabe) and Angel (Vinny's glamour-trash girlfriend).

Ponyboi is a your typical Jersey boy; he loves Bruce Springsteen, the Jersey shore, and a well-rolled blunt. And like all Jersey boys, Ponyboi dreams of getting the hell out of Jersey. However, he believes the only way to do that is by meeting his Prince Charming.

Ponyboi's life changes on a lonely Valentine's day night, when a debonaire cowboy whom he's dreamed about visits him in the laundromat. Through this enchanting encounter with the man of his dreams (literally), Ponyboi discovers that perhaps he is worthy of breaking free from his past and leaving his dead-end life behind.

Tintomara 
Tintomara, a 1970 Swedish-Danish drama film. It is based on the novel Drottningens juvelsmycke by Jonas Love Almqvist and features one of Swedish literature's most enduringly popular characters, the eponymous androgyne Tintomara.

The Mystery of Alexina 
The Mystery of Alexina, a 1985 French film based on the story of Herculine Barbin.

XXY 
The 2007 Argentine film XXY centres around a young intersex person assisted in presenting as a girl by medication. The film deals with discrimination, sexuality and gender identity.

Both 
A 2005 US/Peruvian film in English, Both by filmmaker Lisset Barcellos, won an audience award at the 28th Créteil International Women's Film Festival. The movie is unusual for being a film about an intersex issue directed by an intersex person.

Spork 
Spork, a 2011 musical comedy, written and directed by J.B. Ghuman Jr. in which a frizzy-haired, pink-cheeked outcast named Spork tries to navigate her way through junior high.

Predestination 
Predestination, a 2014 Australian science fiction thriller film, directed and written by Michael and Peter Spierig. The film is based on the Robert A. Heinlein short story "All You Zombies".

Being Impossible 
Being Impossible, or Yo, imposible is a 2018 Venezuelan-Colombian film about a woman who has never felt like she fits in and whose intersex identity has been hidden from her in a Venezuela that doesn't talk about deviance and a religious family that enforces strict gender roles.

See also 
 Literature about intersex
 Television works about intersex
 Intersex characters in fiction

References 

 
Intersex
Intersex-related lists